Rives is a commune in the Isère department in southeastern France.

Population

Access
By road: By motorway (A48) or the Départemental Road, the D1085, between Lyon and Grenoble
By train: The TER Lyon Perrache/Saint André le Gaz/Grenoble line. Rives station is a terminus for some TER suburban trains of the Grenoble Metro
By plane: Saint Étienne de Saint Geoirs' airport (code GNB) is 15 kilometres away from Rives (20 minutes by car.)

Transport

Pays Voironnais network

 The bus line n°10 goes from the railstation to the down-town (route de la Liampre)
 The bus line J stops at Rives
 Some buses of the line M stops at Rives

Transisère network

 The bus line 7300 (Beaurepaire-Grenoble) stops at the station "Rives le plan".
 Some buses of the line 2900 (Vienne-Grenoble) stops at the station "Rives le plan".

Personalities
Napoleon Bonaparte spent a night in Rives, on his return from Elba, in a building that is now a bank. A plaque commemorates the visit.
Luc Court, motor-car builder was born here in 1862.
Jérémy Clément, footballer of Paris Saint-Germain was originally from Rives.
Raphaël Poirée,  biathlete was born here.

International relations
 Forlì del Sannio, Italy
 Refojos de Basto, Portugal

See also
 Communes of the Isère department

References

Communes of Isère
Isère communes articles needing translation from French Wikipedia